The Sharqi or sharki  is a wind in the Middle East that comes from the south and southeast. It is seasonal, lasting from April to early June, and comes again between late September and November. These winds can last for a full day at the beginning and end of the season, and for several days during the middle of the season.

References

Winds